Eduardo Sáenz de Cabezón Irigaray (born June 24, 1972, in Logroño, Spain) is a Spanish mathematician, and professor of computer languages and systems at the University of La Rioja since 2001. He is a recognized specialist in scientific monologues. He develops his research in the area of computational algebra, to which he has contributed 25 research publications and collaborations with Spanish and European mathematicians such as Henry P. Wynn.

Cabezón is also known for disseminating mathematics through conferences, shows and talks for people of all ages around the world. He was the winner of competition for scientific monologues at Famelab Spain (2013) and at the Aquae Foundation (2014), also becoming a finalist at the Cheltenham Science Festival (United Kingdom).

Career 
Eduardo Sáenz de Cabezón studied during his youth at the Sagasta Institute in Logroño. After high school, he decided to study mathematics and computer science, inspired by a teacher passionated about mathematics. He was also licensed in theology at the Pontifical University of Comillas, and holds a PhD in mathematics from the University of La Rioja.

Doctoral thesis 
Cabezón obtained his PhD with the thesis "Combinatorial Koszul homology: computations and applications" for which he obtained the grade of outstanding cum laude unanimously of the court. His thesis is framed within the area of computational algebra. In it, the homology of Koszul for monomial ideals is studied. In the thesis, Cabezón described the structure of this type of ideals based on his Koszul homology, described algorithms for the calculation of this homology, and implemented algorithms that show to be effective.

Popular science 

Cabezón is known for his career in popular science and mathematics. He has been telling stories in bars and cafes for 22 years, but has branched out to host and participate in a variety of mathematics communication events:

Events and conferences 
 He is a member and founder of a group of active scientists and researchers called Big Van Science since 2013, dedicated to scientific dissemination with the aim of bringing scientific communication to all types of audiences. He is also the author of the mathematical show "El baúl de Pitágoras", which was shown in theaters and bars in several cities in Spain since 2012.
 He has participated with the TED organization doing conferences and lectures on the mathematical world.
 Sáenz de Cabezón participated in events such as the 2013 Prince of Asturias Awards, the CERN in Geneva and the World Day of Rare Diseases in 2015 before Queen Letizia of Spain.

TV 
 He is presenter of the Spanish late night show of science and humor Órbita Laika.

Internet 
 He currently has the YouTube channel called Derivando, in which he teaches and explains curiosities about the mathematical world, with a total of over 40 million views and more than 800.000 subscribers.

Books 
 He is the author of the book Inteligencia matemática which attempts to popularize mathematical concepts by comparing them to examples in everyday life. Eduardo argues that they are an opportunity to enjoy reality because: "whether we want it or not, we all have a mathematician in our interior, who maybe got scared at school and remains hidden in a corner".
 He is also co-author of the book Gardner para aficionados: Juegos de matemática recreativa.

References

External links 
Youtube Channel Derivando
 Mathematical papers and articles
 Doctoral Thesis: "Combinatorial Koszul homology: computations and applications"

21st-century Spanish mathematicians
1972 births
Living people
Spanish YouTubers
People from Logroño